"Children's Story" is a song recorded by British-American hip hop artist Slick Rick.  Taken as the second single from his album The Great Adventures of Slick Rick, the song was a Top 5 hit on both the Hot R&B Singles and the Hot Rap Tracks charts. It is one of the most sampled rap songs of all time.

Background
The song interpolates the notes of the bassline from Bob James' song "Nautilus". Throughout the outro, it contains vocal samples from Lyn Collins and James Brown in their song "Think (About It)".

Reception
About.com listed it at 44 on their list of the top 100 rap songs, and is ranked #61 on VH1's 100 Greatest Songs of Hip Hop.

Commercial performance 
Children's Story reached 5 in the Hot R&B Singles, staying there for 19 weeks and 2 on the Hot Rap Tracks, remaining on the charts for 11 weeks. This was the best performing single from The Great Adventures of Slick Rick.

Covers, samples and uses in popular culture 
The 1995 Montell Jordan song "This Is How We Do It", while vastly different lyrically, is musically based on an enhanced sample of Children's Story. 
The opening lines of the song "Once upon a time, not long ago..." were used by Outkast on the song "Wheelz of Steel" off their 1996 album ATLiens.
The song was covered by Tricky on his 1996 album Nearly God,
Everlast covered the song on his 2000 album Eat at Whitey's,
A cover by Black Star (Talib Kweli and Mos Def) is featured on their collaborative album Black Star,
Eminem re-interpreted it as a diss song entitled "Can-I-Bitch"; including shots towards Jermaine Dupri and Canibus. It follows the flow and concept as the original, including the intro of children asking "uncle Marshall, will you tell us a bedtime story?"
The Game on his 2008 Mixtape BWS Radio 5; and was entitled "Compton's Story". He uses an accent much like Slick Rick's throughout the song.
In 2004, "Children's Story" appeared in the video game Grand Theft Auto: San Andreas, on classic hip hop radio station Playback FM.  The song was also featured on the soundtracks for True Crime: New York City, Tony Hawk's Proving Ground and Def Jam Rapstar.
The lyrics "Knock 'em out the box" were also used in Star Wars Gangsta Rap.
The song was also played in the films Notorious & The Sitter.
The lyrics "I need bullets, hurry up run!" are also used by Eminem in the track "Bad Guys Always Die" featuring Dr. Dre from the Wild Wild West soundtrack.
The lyrics "Now this ain't funny so don't you dare laugh" are used in the chorus of "Shit Can Happen" by D12 on the album Devil's Night.
It was heavily sampled on "Cops Shot the Kid" by Nas featuring Kanye West from his album Nasir.
 The song "Just Another Case" by the band Cru uses the lyrics "Now this ain't funny so don't you dare laugh, just another case about the wrong path" as the refrain. The song also guest stars Slick Rick and features a narrative similar to the original song.

Adaptations 
On March 21, 2017, it was announced that "Children's Story" was going to be produced into a children's book by Get On Down, a record label based in Boston, Massachusetts. The book was released with a reissue of the album on Record Store Day.

Charts

Weekly charts

References

1989 singles
1988 songs
Slick Rick songs
Columbia Records singles
Def Jam Recordings singles
Songs written by Slick Rick